The Mal Meninga Cup, known as the Auswide Bank Mal Meninga Cup due to sponsorship, is a junior rugby league football competition based in Queensland, played between teams made up of players aged under 18. The competition, administered by the Queensland Rugby League, features the junior representative teams of Queensland Cup clubs. 

Since 2011, the winners of the Grand Final play the winners of the New South Wales’ under-18 competition, the SG Ball Cup, in the National Final.

The Mal Meninga Cup is named after Mal Meninga, a 32-game Queensland representative and the most successful State of Origin coach of all time.

Teams
The Mal Meninga Cup consists of fourteen clubs: thirteen based within in Queensland and one each in New South Wales. The competition currently operates on a single group system, after using a pool system for eight seasons.

Thirteen of the fifteen clubs are junior representative teams for Queensland Cup clubs. The Western Mustangs and Wide Bay Bulls currently have no Queensland Cup affiliation.

Current clubs

Previous clubs

Grand Final results

See also

Rugby League Competitions in Australia

References

External links

Rugby league competitions in Queensland
Recurring sporting events established in 2009
2009 establishments in Australia
Sports leagues established in 2009
Junior rugby league